Pierre-Luc Thériault (born October 25, 1993 in St-Fabien, Quebec) is a Canadian table tennis player. Pierre-Luc Thériault wanted to represent Canada since watching the Sydney 2000 Olympic Games and seeing other athletes proudly perform for their countries. Thériault began playing for the Canadian Cadet National Team as a 13-year-old, progressing to the Canadian Junior National Team before joining the Canadian Senior National Team in 2010. That year he also debuted at the ITTF World Championships.

He has been on the Canadian World Championship Team ever since. Thériault's first exposure to multi-sport competition came as an alternate for the 2010 Commonwealth Games. He was then part of Team Canada at the 2011 Pan Am Games and the 2014 Commonwealth Games. Thériault also competed at the 2015 Pan American Games in Toronto, winning bronze in the men's team event. Among Thériault's career highlights are winning the singles titles at the North American Championships and North American Cup in 2012.

Best results 
 2011 Pan American Games: 9th (singles), 5th (team)
 2012 North American Champion and  2012 North American Cup Winner
 2014 Commonwealth Games: 17th (singles), 5th (doubles), 9th (team), 33rd (mixed doubles)
 2015 Pan American Games: 5th (singles), Bronze Medal (team)
 Canadian National Tournaments :
 2009 Canadian U21 SinglesChampion 
 2013 Quebec Senior Singles Champion 
 2014 Canada Series Final Winner
 2015 Canada Series Final Winner 
 2015 Canadian Senior Singles Champion

References

1993 births
Living people
Canadian male table tennis players
Sportspeople from Quebec
Table tennis players at the 2011 Pan American Games
Olympic table tennis players of Canada
Table tennis players at the 2014 Commonwealth Games
Table tennis players at the 2015 Pan American Games
Pan American Games medalists in table tennis
Pan American Games bronze medalists for Canada
Medalists at the 2015 Pan American Games
Commonwealth Games competitors for Canada